Krasny Pakhar is a rural locality (a khutor) and the administrative center of Krasnopakharevskoye Rural Settlement, Gorodishchensky District, Volgograd Oblast, Russia. The population was 553 as of 2010. There are 9 streets.

Geography 
Krasny Pakhar is located in steppe, on the right bank of the Rossoshka River, 35 km west of Gorodishche (the district's administrative centre) by road. Stepnoy is the nearest rural locality.

References 

Rural localities in Gorodishchensky District, Volgograd Oblast